Yang Chengxu is a senior Chinese diplomat to German-speaking countries.

He was born in Qingdao in 1930 and later moved to Shanghai with his family. In 1952, he received his bachelor's degree in German Literature from Fudan University and started to work for the All-China Journalists Association.
In 1962, Yang was sent to the Xinhua News Agency-founded Foreign Languages Institute to take advanced training courses.
In 1973, he joined the Chinese Foreign Ministry and served successively as Secretary, Counsellor and Minister-Counsellor in Chinese Embassies in Federal Republic of Germany and German Democratic Republic.

In 1985, he was appointed Chinese Ambassador to Austria and was succeeded by Hu Benyao in 1989.
He was then appointed director of the Department of Policy Planning and deputy director of the Department of West European Affairs of the Foreign Ministry.

From May 1993, he succeeded Du Gong as President of the China Institute of International Studies and was relieved from the position in November 2001.
He also chaired PECC China, the China National Committee for Pacific Economic Cooperation (CNCPEC) from 1995 to 2005.

References 

Ambassadors of China to Austria
Politicians from Qingdao
Fudan University alumni
Beijing International Studies University people
1930 births
Living people
People's Republic of China politicians from Shandong